The 2019–20 Elite League, also known as 2019–20 Hero Elite League for sponsorship reasons, was the twelfth season of the Indian Elite League and the fifth season of the competition as an under-18 one. Punjab F.C. were the defending champions.

On 18 April 2020, All India Football Federation, the organising body of the league announced that the league would be called off due to coronavirus pandemic.

Zonal round

Maharashtra zone 
The matches of Maharashtra zone kicked off on 25 November 2019 with Kenkre defeating Mumbaikars 5–1 in the opening game.

Chennai & Bengaluru zone

Delhi, Jaipur & Punjab zone

Goa zone 
The matches of Goa zone kicked off on 21 December 2019 with a 2–2 draw between Sesa Football Academy and Sporting Goa.

Kolkata zone

Shillong & Assam zone

Jharkhand & Odisha zone 
The matches of Jharkhand & Odisha zone kicked off on 15 February 2020 with a 2–2 draw between SAIL Football Academy Bokaro and Dhanbad Football Academy.

Statistics

Top scorers

Cleansheets

References

External links 
 Elite League on the I-League website
 Elite League on the AIFF website

Youth League U18
2019–20 in Indian football